The PlayStation Multitap is a peripheral for the PlayStation. It is an adapter that can be used to plug in up to four controllers and memory cards at the same time in a single controller port. With a second multitap, up to eight controllers and memory cards can be plugged at once.

Compatibility
The PlayStation Multitap was originally available in gray (SCPH-1070 U) to match the original console's color, however it was later re-released in white as well (SCPH-1070 UH) to match the colors of the later PS one redesign. Both versions are compatible with the original PS one, as well as all models of the PlayStation 2 prior to the SCPH-70000 series. Both versions of SCPH-1070 will only function with original PlayStation games, while multiplayer PS2 games required a separate multitap, the SCPH-10090. PlayStation 2 consoles after the SCPH-70000 series require the SCPH-70120 multitap, which is compatible with both PS and PS2 software.

Supported games
1–3 Players
 Bishi Bashi Special
 Capcom Generations: Blazing Guns
 Captain Commando
 Rampage Through Time
 Rampage 2: Universal Tour

1-4 Players

 Actua Golf 3
 Actua Ice Hockey
 Actua Ice Hockey 2
 Actua Soccer 2
 Actua Tennis
 adidas Power Soccer
 adidas Power Soccer 2
 adidas Power Soccer 98
 adidas Power Soccer International 97
 All Star Tennis 2000
 All Star Tennis '99
 All Star Watersports
 Anna Kournikova's Smash Court Tennis
 Anokodokonoko
 Arcade's Greatest Hits: The Atari Collection 2
 Art Camion Sugorokuden
 Atari: Anniversary Edition
 Backyard Soccer
 Battle Hunter
 Blaze & Blade: Eternal Quest
 Blood Lines
 Blast Chamber
 Blaze and Blade: Eternal Quest
 Blaze and Blade Busters
 Bleach Blade Battlers 2nd
 Blood Lines
 Bomberman Land
 Breakout
 Break Point
 Brian Lara Cricket
 Buttsubushi
 Caesars Palace 2000
 Caesars Palace II
 California Surfing
 Card Shark
 Catan: Die Erste Insel
 Chessmaster II
 Chocobo Collection
 Circuit Breakers
 College Slam
 Crash Bash
 CTR: Crash Team Racing
 Cubix - Robots for Everyone: Race 'N Robots
 CyberTiger
 David Beckham Soccer
 Davis Cup Complete Tennis
 Destruction Derby: Raw
 Dinomaster Party
 Dioramos
 Disney's Pooh's Party Game: In Search of the Treasure
 Dragon Money
 Dynamite Soccer 98
 ECW Anarchy Rulz
 ECW Hardcore Revolution
 ESPN MLS GameNight
 European Super League
 Family Games Compendium
 Fantastic Four
 The F.A. Premier League Stars 2001
 The F.A. Premier League Stars
 Fire Pro Wrestling G
 Fox Sports Golf '99
 Frogger
 Frogger 2: Swampy's Revenge
 Galaxian 3
 Gekido
 Gritz: The Pyramid Adventure
 High School! Kimengumi: The Table Hockey
 Hi・Hou・Ou: Mou Omae Tobakuchi Kikan!!
 Hogs of War
 Hot Shots Golf
 Hot Shots Golf 2
 Hot Wheels: Extreme Racing
 Hyper Tennis: Final Match
 International Superstar Soccer 2000
 International Superstar Soccer Deluxe
 International Track & Field 1996
 International Track & Field 2000
 ISS Pro Evolution
 ISS Pro Evolution 2
 Itadaki Street: Gorgeous King
 Jarrett & Labonte Stock Car Racing
 Jetracer
 Jigsaw Island: Japan Graffiti
 Jigsaw Madness
 Jonah Lomu Rugby
 Jun Classic C.C. & Rope Club
 Karei Naru Casino Club: Double Draw
 Kick Off World
 Klonoa Beach Volleyball
 Kurt Warner's Arena Football Unleashed
 Love Game's WaiWai Tennis Plus
 Meru Purana
 Michael Owen's World League Soccer '99
 Missland 2
 Monster Racer
 Monte Carlo Games Compendium
 Motor Mash
 Motto Trump Shiyouyo!: i-mode no Grand Prix
 Ms. Pac-Man Maze Madness
 MTV: Music Generator
 Nagano Winter Olympics '98
 NBA Jam Extreme
 NBA Jam Tournament Edition
 NBA Showtime: NBA on NBC
 Need for Speed: Porsche Unleashed (US) / Need for Speed: Porsche 2000 (PAL)
 Need for Speed: V-Rally 2
 NFL Blitz 2000
 NFL Blitz 2001
 NHL Open Ice: 2 On 2 Challenge
 NOON: New Type Action Game
 Olympic Soccer
 Pangaea
 Panzer Bandit
 Paro Wars
 Peter Jacobsen's Golden Tee Golf
 Pete Sampras Tennis 97
 Pitball
 Polaris SnoCross
 Pong: The Next Level
 Power Play Sports Trivia
 Power Spike: Pro Beach Volleyball
 Poy Poy
 Poy Poy 2
 Premier Manager 2000
 Premier Manager: Ninety Nine
 Pro Evolution Soccer
 Pro Wrestling Sengokuden: Hyper Tag Match
 Putter Golf
 Puyo Puyo Box
 Quake II
 Rageball
 Rakugaki Showtime (Japan)
 Rally Cross
 Rat Attack!
 Risk: The Game of Global Domination
 Road Rash: Jailbreak
 Running Wild
 S.C.A.R.S.
 Scrabble
 Shinobi no Roku
 Simple 1500 Series: Vol.55 - The Darts
 Simple 1500 Series: Vol.60 - The Table Hockey
 Simple 1500 Series: Vol.65 - The Golf
 Simple 1500 Series: Vol.72 - The Beach Volleyball
 Sky Sports Football Quiz
 Sky Sports Football Quiz Season 02
 Slam 'N Jam '96 featuring Magic & Kareem
 Sled Storm
 Smash Court
 Soccer '97
 South Park: Chef's Luv Shack
 Speed Punks
 Striker '96
 Striker Pro 2000
 Suchie-Pai Adventure: Doki Doki Nightmare
 Super Football Champ
 SuperLite 1500 Series: Anokodokonoko Endless Season
 Syndicate Wars
 Tales of Destiny II
 Tales of Eternia (Premium Box)
 Team Buddies
 Tennis
 Tennis Arena
 Tiger Woods 99 PGA Tour Golf
 Tiger Woods PGA Tour 2000
 Tiger Woods PGA Tour 2001
 TOCA World Touring Cars
 Trash It
 Trump Shiyouyo! Fukkoku-ban
 Twisted Metal 4
 Twisted Metal III
 TimeSplitters
 TimeSplitters 2
 TimeSplitters: Future Perfect
 Uchū Gōshōden: Bakuretsu Akindo
 UEFA Challenge
 UEFA Champions League Season 1998/99
 Vegas Casino
 Vegas Games 2000
 Viva Soccer
 VR Golf '97
 Waku Waku Derby
 WCW Mayhem
 Westlife Fan-O-Mania
 Who Wants to Be a Millionaire
 Who Wants to Be a Millionaire: 2nd Edition
 World League Soccer '98
 World Soccer: Winning Eleven 6 International
 Wu-Tang: Shaolin Style
 WWF Attitude
 WWF in Your House
 WWF Smackdown!
 WWF Smackdown! 2: Know Your Role
 WWF War Zone
 Yeh Yeh Tennis
 ZigZagBall
 Zipangujima: Unmei wa Saikoro ga Kimeru!?

1-5 Players
 Aquarian Age: Tokyo Wars
 Bomberman: Party Edition
 Bomberman World
 Devil Dice
 Shipwreckers!

1-6 Players
 Brunswick Circuit Pro Bowling
 The Game of Life
 NBA Hoopz
 Space Jam
 Ten Pin Alley
 Top Shop

1-8 Players

 2002 FIFA World Cup
 Actua Soccer 3
 All Star Soccer
 Cardinal Syn
 Chris Kamara's Street Soccer
 Dare Devil Derby 3D
 FIFA 2000: Major League Soccer
 FIFA 99
 FIFA: Road to World Cup 98
 FIFA Soccer 2002: Major League Soccer
 FIFA Soccer 2003
 FIFA Soccer 2004
 FIFA Soccer 2005
 FIFA Soccer 96
 FIFA Soccer 97
 FoxKids.com Micro Maniacs Racing
 Fox Sports Soccer '99
 Inspector Gadget: Gadget's Crazy Maze
 Jimmy Johnson's VR Football '98
 Madden NFL 2000
 Madden NFL 2001
 Madden NFL 2002
 Madden NFL 2003
 Madden NFL 2004
 Madden NFL 2005
 Madden NFL 97
 Madden NFL 98
 Madden NFL 99
 March Madness '98
 Micro Machines V3
 Micro Maniacs
 Monopoly
 Monster Rancher Battle Card Episode II
 NBA Action 98
 NBA Basketball 2000
 NBA in the Zone
 NBA in the Zone 2
 NBA in the Zone 2000
 NBA in the Zone '98
 NBA in the Zone '99
 NBA Live 2000
 NBA Live 2001
 NBA Live 2002
 NBA Live 2003
 NBA Live 96
 NBA Live 97
 NBA Live 98
 NBA Live 99
 NBA ShootOut
 NBA ShootOut 2000
 NBA ShootOut 2001
 NBA ShootOut 2002
 NBA ShootOut 2004
 NBA ShootOut '97
 NCAA Basketball Final Four '97
 NCAA Final Four 2000
 NCAA Final Four 2001
 NCAA Final Four 99
 NCAA Football 2000
 NCAA Football 2001
 NCAA Football 98
 NCAA Football 99
 NCAA Gamebreaker
 NCAA GameBreaker 2000
 NCAA GameBreaker 2001
 NCAA GameBreaker 98
 NCAA GameBreaker 99
 NCAA March Madness 2000
 NCAA March Madness 2001
 NCAA March Madness 99
 NFL GameDay 2000
 NFL GameDay 2001
 NFL GameDay 2002
 NFL GameDay 2003
 NFL GameDay 2004
 NFL GameDay 2005
 NFL GameDay '97
 NFL GameDay 98
 NFL GameDay 99
 NFL Quarterback Club 97
 NFL Xtreme 2
 NHL 2000
 NHL 2001
 NHL 97
 NHL 98
 NHL 99
 NHL Blades of Steel 2000
 NHL Breakaway 98
 NHL Championship 2000
 NHL FaceOff 2000
 NHL FaceOff 2001
 NHL FaceOff '97
 NHL FaceOff '98
 NHL FaceOff '99
 NHL Powerplay 98
 Olympic Games: Atlanta 1996
 Pro 18 World Tour Golf
 Professional Underground League of Pain
 Puma Street Soccer
 Rival Schools
 Shaolin
 Shiritsu Justice Gakuen: Nekketsu Seishun Nikki 2
 Street Racer
 Super Match Soccer
 Sydney 2000
 This Is Football
 This Is Football 2
 Triple Play 97
 Triple Play 98
 Triple Play 99
 UEFA Champions League Season 1999/2000
 UEFA Champions League Season 2000/2001
 UEFA Euro 2000
 World Cup 98

References

PlayStation (console) accessories